Travelers is a science fiction television series created by Brad Wright, starring Eric McCormack, Mackenzie Porter, Jared Abrahamson, Nesta Cooper, Reilly Dolman, and Patrick Gilmore. The first two seasons were co-produced by Netflix and Canadian specialty channel Showcase. After the second season, Netflix became the sole commissioning broadcaster and worldwide distributor. The show premiered in Canada on October 17, 2016, and worldwide on December 23, 2016. A second season followed in 2017, and a third season was released on December 14, 2018. In February 2019, McCormack said that the series had been cancelled.

Premise 
In a post-apocalyptic future, thousands of special operatives are tasked with preventing the collapse of society. These operatives, known as "travelers", have their consciousnesses sent back in time and transferred into the "host" body of present-day individuals who are about to die, minimizing unexpected impact on the future. The transfer requires the exact location of the target, made possible by 21st-century smartphones and GPS, providing time, elevation, latitude, and longitude (TELL) coordinates that are archived for use in the future. No transfer can be safely made to a time prior to one already performed.

Using social media and public records, travelers learn about their hosts, each maintaining the host's pre-existing life as cover for the rest of their lives. In teams of five, they carry out missions dictated by the Director, an artificial intelligence monitoring the timeline from the future. The goal of the missions is to save the world from a series of catastrophic events. The Director can communicate with travelers through prepubescent children, who, unlike adults, can safely be animated by the Director for a short time without risking death.

Protocols
Travelers have several protocols to protect the timeline: 
 Protocol 1: The mission comes first.
 Protocol 2: Leave the future in the past.
 Protocol 3: Don't take a life, don't save a life, unless otherwise directed. Do not interfere.
 Protocol 4: Do not reproduce.
 Protocol 5: In the absence of direction, maintain your host's life.
 Protocol 6: Do not communicate with other known travelers outside of your team unless sanctioned by the Director.

The team historians have an additional secret protocol involving the periodic updates they receive concerning "historic information relative to [their] team's role in the Grand Plan". It is a sub-protocol of Protocol 2:
 Protocol 2H: This forbids the revelation about the existence of the updates "with anyone, ever".

The Director can invoke three other protocols in special situations: 
 Protocol Alpha: temporarily suspends all other protocols when a critical mission must be completed at all costs
 Protocol Epsilon: can be invoked when traveler archives are threatened
 Protocol Omega: permanently suspends all other protocols when the Director abandons the travelers because the future has either been fixed or deemed impossible to fix

Cast

Main
 Eric McCormack as Grant MacLaren (Traveler 3468), the team's leader, who assumes the life of a married FBI special agent
 MacKenzie Porter as Marcy Warton (Traveler 3569), the team's medic, who assumes the life of an intellectually disabled woman
 Nesta Cooper as Carly Shannon (Traveler 3465), the team's tactician, who assumes the life of a stay-at-home single mother
 Jared Abrahamson as Trevor Holden (Traveler 0115), the team's engineer and one of the oldest humans ever, who assumes the life of a high school athlete
 Reilly Dolman as Philip Pearson (Traveler 3326), the team's historian, who assumes the life of a college-aged heroin addict
 Patrick Gilmore as David Mailer, Marcy's social worker and later romantic interest

Recurring
 J. Alex Brinson as Jeff Conniker, Carly's abusive police officer ex-boyfriend and the father of her son
 Leah Cairns as Kathryn "Kat" MacLaren, Grant's wife who works as an interior designer
 Enrico Colantoni as Vincent Ingram, the first traveler (Traveler 001) whose host was supposed to die on September 11, 2001
 Chad Krowchuk as Simon, Traveler 004, a specialist who set up the travelers' communications system in the 21st, then was deceived into building consciousness transfer technology for Vincent
 Arnold Pinnock as Walt Forbes, MacLaren's partner at the FBI, later a member of the Faction posing as Traveler 4112 and, subsequently, Traveler 4991
 Jennifer Spence as Grace Day, Trevor's high school counselor and later Traveler 0027, a programmer who helped create the Director
 Ian Tracey as Ray Green, Philip's lawyer and later friend, a compulsive gambler
 Kimberley Sustad as Joanne Yates, MacLaren's new FBI partner who is later assigned by the FBI director to act as the liaison between the FBI and the Traveler program

Guest

Introduced in season 1
 David Lewis as Major Gleason, a hotheaded military officer
 Kyra Zagorsky as Dr. Delaney, a brilliant scientist who developed a method for collecting and storing antimatter
 Kristine Cofsky as Victoria Boyd, Traveler 3185, who assumes the life of a police officer
 Giacomo Baessato as Private Wilson, a soldier who works for Gleason
 Alyssa Lynch as Rene Bellamy, a high school student and Trevor's girlfriend
 Tom McBeath as Ellis, Traveler 0014, a programmer who assumes the life of a farmer
 Eileen Pedde as Mom, a traveler who assumes the role of a mother in a family of four
 Yasmeene Ball as Charlotte, a misfire traveler historian; later a traveler assassin
 Glynis Davies as Jacqueline, a representative of Child Protective Services
 Melanie Papalia as Beth, an FBI analyst working for MacLaren
 Karin Konoval as Bloom, Traveler 0117, a high ranking traveler engineer
 Louis Ferreira as Rick Hall, a jaded traveler team leader
 Douglas Chapman as Luca Shun, Traveler 2587, a member of Hall's team
 Jason Gray-Stanford as Aaron Donner, Traveler 4022 (and later Traveler 4024), a bomber
 William MacDonald as Gary Holden, Trevor's father
 Teryl Rothery as Patricia Holden, Trevor's mother
 Dylan Playfair as Kyle, a friend of Trevor, later historian Traveler 5532
 Gerard Plunkett as Ted Bishop, a congressman
 Matthew Kevin Anderson as Derek, Traveler D13, a traveler doctor assigned to save MacLaren
 David Raynolds, introduced as foster child Aleksander (episode of the same name), returns as a guest in Season 3's "Protocol 3"

Introduced in season 2
 Stephen Lobo as Agent Wakefield, a faction member posing as a traveler who is later overwritten by the Director
 Paloma Kwiatkowski as Abigail Paris, a young woman that Trevor befriends
 Lee Majdoub as Dr. Barker, a doctor with a romantic interest in Marcy
 Sunita Prasad as Blair, David's girlfriend
 Melissa Roxburgh as Carrie, Travelers 5001–5007, a skydiver assigned to prevent the assassination of MacLaren's team
 Amanda Tapping as Katrina Perrow, Traveler 001's psychologist, who is later taken over by 001 before the Director can overwrite him
 Stephanie Bennett as Jenny, Traveler 4514, a traveler assigned to help Philip with his heroin addiction
 Josh Blacker as Agent Callahan, a Traveler who assumes the life of an FBI agent

Introduced in season 3
 Benjamin Ratner as Ivon Teslia, a computer engineer responsible for the creation of the artificial intelligence (AI) Ilsa
 Rebecca Soichet as the voice of Ilsa, the AI hosting the Director in the 21st century
 Magda Apanowicz as Dawn, a Faction traveler loyal to Traveler 001
 Christopher Heyerdahl as Andrew Graeme (Traveler 7189), a mathematician whose host is discovered to be a serial killer
 Veronika Hadrava as Katrina (Traveler A18), an Archivist
 Karen Holness as Samantha Burns, a physicist responsible for designing the singularity engine

Episodes

Season 1 (2016–17)
The first season premiered on Netflix on December 23, 2016, before its final two episodes aired on Showcase.

Season 2 (2017)

Season 3 (2018)

Critical reception
The first season of Travelers received a score of 100% on Rotten Tomatoes based on nine reviews with an average rating of 8.0/10. Neil Genzlinger, writing for The New York Times, described the first season as "tasty", and "enjoyable science fiction", with "some attention-grabbing flourishes and fine acting". Hanh Nguyen, writing for IndieWire, described the series as "fun and freaky", finding the series' appeal "in how the core group of five travelers adjust to life in our present", noting the "human nature in the travelers". Lawrence Devoe, of TheaterByte.com, called the series "tautly paced and suspenseful" with "well-developed characters", declaring that "Brad Wright has a real knack for creating futuristic series". Evan Narcisse, reviewing the first five episodes of the first season for io9, appreciated the moral dilemmas offered by the series premise and the awkwardness presented by the characters' interactions with their hosts' friends, colleagues, lovers, or caretakers: "This is a superhero show in double disguise, offering up clever explorations of the secret identity concept that touch on the guilt and contortions that come with living a double life." Netflix announced that the series was one of its "most devoured" series in 2017.

Writing in Forbes, Merrill Barr said of the second season: "There's a lot to love about what Travelers brings to the table this season. The show has truly come into its own." In reviewing the first two episodes of the second season, Nguyen of Indiewire called Travelers "an exploration of the human condition in all of its messy glory, [with] depictions of the most ingenious, yet disturbing means of time travel on screen".

Barr of Forbes said the third season brought "a mixed approach as the show returns to its mission-of-the-week roots of season one, but this time while remixing the format with episodes of different substance from chapter to chapter. [...]What we get this year from the show is the best example of what a television series should be."

Netflix was criticized for using real footage from the Lac-Megantic rail disaster in the third season. The use of such footage was considered by many to be inappropriate for fictional content, and many sought to have the footage removed. Carrie Mudd, president of Peacock Alley, said they were not aware of the origin of the footage and the affected episode would be re-edited. The stock film company that provided the clip also apologized, pledging to review how images can be repurposed by Hollywood clients.

References

External links
 
 

2016 American television series debuts
2018 American television series endings
2010s American science fiction television series
2010s American time travel television series
2010s Canadian science fiction television series
2010s Canadian time travel television series
2016 Canadian television series debuts
2018 Canadian television series endings
American time travel television series
Canadian time travel television series
Showcase (Canadian TV channel) original programming
English-language Netflix original programming
Television series by Corus Entertainment
Television shows filmed in Vancouver
Temporal war fiction